Archipelago Tomorrow is a centre-right political movement in the French collectivité d'outre-mer of Saint Pierre and Miquelon.

See also 

 Catherine Hélène
 Stéphane Lenormand

References

Political parties in Saint Pierre and Miquelon